Michurinsk is a rural locality (a selo) and the administrative centre of Michurinsky Selsoviet, Sharansky District, Bashkortostan, Russia. The population was 328 in 2010. There are seven streets.

Geography 
Michurinsk is located 16 km northeast of Sharan (the district's administrative centre) by road. Bulansaz is the nearest rural locality.

References 

Rural localities in Sharansky District